Bihaiwan station is a station on Line 11 of the Shenzhen Metro. It opened on 28 June 2016.

Station layout

Exits

References

Railway stations in Guangdong
Shenzhen Metro stations
Railway stations in China opened in 2016